Humak University of Applied Sciences (i.e. "Humanist"; HUMAK) is a university of applied sciences (a polytechnic) in Finland. Humak is a leading educator in the humanities, pedagogy, and cultural management in Finland.

Humak is a nationwide university of applied sciences, specialising in the development of expertise in organisational activities and youth work, work community development, adventure education, entrepreneurship in cultural management and creative industries, and language accessibility in the interpreting sector. Humak operates in four regions: the Helsinki Region (Helsinki, Kauniainen and Nurmijärvi), Jyväskylä, Kuopio and Turku.

Humak's strategical research, development, and innovation activities are especially focused in these areas: cultural management and conveyance of culture, youth work and communality, organisation work, work communities, and integration and interpreting and linguistic accessibility. Humak is the largest educator in Europe in the fields of NGO work and youth work.

See also
 HAMK
 TAMK

References

External links
official website

Universities and colleges in Finland
Education in Helsinki